Iain Somerled Macdonald-Smith , (born 3 July 1945) is a British sailor and Olympic Champion. He competed at the 1968 Summer Olympics in Mexico City and won a gold medal in the Flying Dutchman class, together with Rodney Pattisson.

He was educated at Marlborough College and Selwyn College, Cambridge, before becoming a solicitor.

References

External links
 
 
 

1945 births
Living people
English male sailors (sport)
English Olympic medallists
Olympic sailors of Great Britain
Olympic gold medallists for Great Britain
Olympic medalists in sailing
Sailors at the 1968 Summer Olympics – Flying Dutchman
Sailors at the 1976 Summer Olympics – Soling
Medalists at the 1968 Summer Olympics
Flying Dutchman class world champions
World champions in sailing for Great Britain
People educated at Marlborough College
Alumni of Selwyn College, Cambridge
Sportspeople from Oxford